George F. Pond (October 5, 1844 – June 21, 1911) served in the Union Army during the American Civil War. He received the Medal of Honor.

Pond was born on October 5, 1844, in Libertyville, Illinois, although his official residence was listed as Fairwater, Wisconsin. He was the brother of fellow Medal of Honor recipient James Pond. He died June 21, 1911 and is buried in Evergreen Cemetery Fort Scott, Kansas. His grave can be found in section 4.

Medal of Honor citation
Citation:

For extraordinary heroism on 15 May 1864, while serving with Company C, 3d Wisconsin Cavalry, in action at Drywood, Kansas. With two companions, Private Pond attacked a greatly superior force of guerrillas, routed them, and rescued several prisoners.

See also

List of Medal of Honor recipients
List of American Civil War Medal of Honor recipients: M–P

References

External links

1844 births
1911 deaths
People from Libertyville, Illinois
People from Fond du Lac County, Wisconsin
People of Wisconsin in the American Civil War
United States Army Medal of Honor recipients
Union Army soldiers
Military personnel from Wisconsin
American Civil War recipients of the Medal of Honor